The Order of the Star of Africa is an order presented by the government of Liberia.

Criteria
The Order of the Star of Africa is presented in five grades, Knight, Officer, Grand Commander, Grand Officer, and Grand Cross.  Liberian and foreign citizens may be invested with the order for distinguished service to the Republic of Liberia or to Africa in public service or in the arts and sciences.

Appearance
The badge and star of the Order of the Star of Africa is a nine-pointed white enamel and silver gilded star.  Between the arms of the star are gilt rays with a  five-pointed pale blue star superimposed on the rays.  On the obverse of the insignia, in the center, is a circular gilded medallion bearing the intertwined letters LR above the date 1920, surrounded by a pale blue enamel ring.  On the ring are the gold letters The Love of Liberty Brought Us Here.  The reverse of the badge is identical to the obverse except for the central medallion, which bears an allegorical female figure reaching for a shining star surrounded by a red enamel ring.  The ring is inscribed in gold letters Light in Darkness.

Recipients

Akihito
Charles Taylor
Gustaf Adolf Boltenstern Jr.
Mary Broh
Benjamin O. Davis, Sr., United States Army
John Warren Davis (college president)
Luther H. Foster Jr.
Piet de Jong
Moshe Mayer
Isaac Michaelson
Ambassador Chigozie Obi-Nnadozie
Salim Ahmed Salim
Tzvi Tzur
Ambassador George Wallace
George Werner, former Minister of Education

Knights Grand Band
 Elizabeth II
 Juliana of the Netherlands
 Prince Edward, Duke of Kent
 Prince Philip, Duke of Edinburgh

Grand Commander
 Wulf Gatter, German environmentalist and ornithologist
 Fatima Massaquoi, writer and academic

References

1920 establishments in Africa
Awards established in 1920
Orders, decorations, and medals of Liberia